Obou Macaire (born 28 December 1970) is an Ivorian footballer. He played in eight matches for the Ivory Coast national football team in 1995 and 1996. He was also named in Ivory Coast's squad for the 1994 African Cup of Nations tournament.

References

1970 births
Living people
Ivorian footballers
Ivory Coast international footballers
1994 African Cup of Nations players
Place of birth missing (living people)
Association footballers not categorized by position